The Eveleth Manual Training School was the first vocational school in the U.S. state of Minnesota, built in the city of Eveleth in 1914.  It was a publicly funded school founded to prepare workers for the increasing mechanization of the local mining industry.  The school offered a two-year program for high school and adult males.  Initial courses covered sheet metal work, forging, and engine repair.  Within a few years classes had expanded to cover woodworking, cabinetry, plumbing, printing, mechanical drafting, and electrical work. In the 1960s and 1970s, the building was used by the Eveleth Independent School District as the "Industrial Arts Building" for 9th through 12th grade students, teaching the skills already noted.

The building was listed on the National Register of Historic Places in 1980 for its local significance in the themes of architecture, education, and industry.  It was nominated as a pivotal emblem of the Progressive Era response to mass production and betterment of the working class.

See also
 National Register of Historic Places listings in St. Louis County, Minnesota

References

1914 establishments in Minnesota
Defunct schools in Minnesota
Former school buildings in the United States
Modernist architecture in Minnesota
National Register of Historic Places in St. Louis County, Minnesota
School buildings completed in 1914
School buildings on the National Register of Historic Places in Minnesota
Schools in St. Louis County, Minnesota
Vocational schools in the United States